Washington County Jail and Sheriff's Residence may refer to:

Washington County Jail and Sheriff's Residence (Salem, Indiana), listed on the NRHP in Indiana
Washington County Jail and Sheriff's Residence (Washington, Kansas), listed on the NRHP in Kansas

See also
Washington County Jail (disambiguation)